Tasmannia stipitata, commonly known as the Dorrigo pepper or northern pepperbush is a rainforest shrub of temperate forests of the Northern Tablelands of New South Wales, Australia. Leaves are fragrant, narrow-lanceolate to narrow-elliptic, 8–13 cm long. Dark bluish to mauve berries follow the flowers on female shrubs. The species is dioecious, with male and female flowers on separate plants.

Culinary use
The culinary quality of T. stipitata was recognized in the mid-1980s by horticulturist Peter Hardwick, who gave it the name 'Dorrigo pepper', and Jean-Paul Bruneteau, then chef at Rowntrees Restaurant, Sydney. It is mainly wild harvested from the Northern Tablelands of New South Wales. Dorrigo pepper has a woody-cinnamon and peppery note in the leaves and the fruit/seed. The hot peppery flavor is derived from polygodial, an essential oil component, common to most species in the family.

Research
Research showed that T. stipitata has the potential to be used as an anti food spoilage and medicinal agent because of its low toxicity and moderate broad spectrum inhibitory activity against bacteria, fungi and Giardia.

See also

List of Australian herbs and spices

References

Further reading
 Bruneteau, Jean-Paul, Tukka - Real Australian Food, 
 Harden, G.J., Flora of New South Wales, Volume 1,

External links
Tasmannia stipitata Occurrence data from AVH
Buy CBD Oil Online

Bushfood
Flora of New South Wales
Magnoliids of Australia
stipitata
Spices
Dioecious plants